24 February 1956 Stadium is a multi-use stadium in Sidi Bel Abbès, Algeria. It is currently used mostly for football matches and is the home ground of USM Bel Abbès.  The stadium holds 45,000 spectators.

History
The stadium was open on 19 June 1981 and it hosted the final match of the Algerian cup 1980-81 between ASC Oran and USK Alger. It replaced the historical stadium in the city of Sidi Bel Abbès, "The Three Amarouch Brothers Stadium" (Stade des Trois Frères Amarouch).

Matches

1980-81 Algerian Cup

1986 International friendly

References

External links
Stadium Information
dzfoot club profile 

24 Fevrier
Buildings and structures in Sidi Bel Abbès Province
1981 establishments in Algeria